Minnesota State Highway 43 (MN 43) is a highway in southeast Minnesota, which runs from its intersection with State Highway 44 in Mabel and continues north to its northern terminus at the Wisconsin state line at Winona, where it becomes Wisconsin Highway 54 upon crossing the Mississippi River.

Route description
State Highway 43 serves as a north–south route between Mabel, Rushford, and Winona in southeast Minnesota.

The route crosses the Root River in Fillmore County.

Highway 43 passes through the Richard J. Dorer State Forest.

The northern terminus of Highway 43 is at the Mississippi River at Winona, where the route becomes Wisconsin Highway 54 upon crossing the Main Channel and North Channel bridges over the river to Wisconsin.

History
State Highway 43 was authorized in 1920 between Rushford and Winona. The remainder of the route between Rushford and Mabel was authorized in 1933.

Highway 43 was paved from Wilson to Winona by 1929. The only gravel section remaining by 1940 was south of Rushford.  The route was completely paved by 1953.

A major project in the 1980s to rebuild Highway 43 from Interstate 90 to Winona as an expressway ran out of money.  Only one carriageway was actually paved. There is still visible road bed and bridges east of the roadway in this section.

In response to the I-35W Bridge collapse in Minneapolis on August 1, 2007, all Minnesota bridges were ordered to be inspected.  During an inspection, "gusset plate corrosion issues" were discovered in the Main Channel Bridge (Highway 43 / Highway 54), which crosses the Mississippi River between Winona, MN and nearby Fountain City, WI.  The Main Channel Bridge (Bridge #5900) was closed to traffic on June 3, 2008.  MnDOT made a statement this was due to gusset plate corrosion issues similar to those that caused the I-35W Bridge to collapse.  The Main Channel Bridge reopened to car traffic on June 14, 2008.   Commercial vehicles were still directed to find alternate routes across the river.  The bridge was scheduled for replacement in 2017, which has been moved up to 2014.

Major intersections

References

043
Transportation in Fillmore County, Minnesota
Transportation in Winona County, Minnesota